Costantino Sala (born 3 May 1913 in Monza) was an Italian professional football player.

His older brother Valentino Sala played in the Serie A for Genoa C.F.C. and F.C. Internazionale Milano in the 1930s. To distinguish them, Valentino was referred to as Sala I and Costantino as Sala II.

Honours
 Serie A champion: 1937/38.
 Coppa Italia winner: 1938/39.

1913 births
Year of death missing
Italian footballers
Serie A players
A.C. Monza players
Inter Milan players
Brescia Calcio players
F.C. Pro Vercelli 1892 players
Calcio Lecco 1912 players
Association football defenders